Myadestes is a genus of solitaires, medium-sized mostly insectivorous birds in the thrush family, Turdidae.

They are found in the Americas and Hawaii, where several island species have become extinct.

Species in taxonomic order
 Myadestes occidentalis Stejneger, 1882 - brown-backed solitaire (Mexico, northern Central America)
Myadestes unicolor Sclater, 1857 - slate-colored solitaire (Mexico, Central America)
Myadestes townsendi Audubon, 1838 - Townsend's solitaire (North America)
Myadestes myadestinus  - kāmao (Kauai) (extinct, 1990s)
Myadestes palmeri Rothschild, 1893 - puaiohi (Kauai)
Myadestes lanaiensis Wilson, 1891 - olomao (Oahu, Maui, Lānai and Molokai) (probably extinct, 1980s?)
 Myadestes lanaiensis woahensis - āmaui (extinct, 1850s)
Myadestes lanaiensis lanaiensis - Lānai olomao (extinct, 1931–1933)
 Myadestes lanaiensis rutha - Molokai olomao (probably extinct, 1980s?)
Myadestes obscurus J. F. Gmelin, 1789 - ōmao (island of Hawaii)
 Myadestes elisabeth Lembeye, 1850 - Cuban solitaire
 Myadestes elisabeth retrusus - pines solitaire (probably extinct, late 1930s, or 1970s?)
 Myadestes genibarbis  - rufous-throated solitaire (Caribbean)
 Myadestes melanops  - black-faced solitaire (Costa Rica, western Panama)
 Myadestes coloratus Nelson, 1912 - varied solitaire (Panama, Colombia)
 Myadestes ralloides D'Orbigny, 1840 - Andean solitaire

References
https://www.jstor.org/stable/4072338

 
Bird genera

Taxa named by William John Swainson